This is a list of reptiles of Metropolitan France. For the reptiles of Overseas departments and territories of France, see List of reptiles of Guadeloupe or List of reptiles of Martinique.

There are 20 species of lizards, 12 species of snakes and 4 species of turtles.

Species include:
 Lizards
 Tarentola mauritanica

 Snakes
 Vipera aspis

 Turtles
 Emys orbicularis, the European pond turtle

See also 
 Fauna of Metropolitan France

External links 
 The Reptile Database

 Metropolitan France
Reptiles
France